Niobichthys ferrarisi is the only species of the monotypic genus Niobichthys of loricariid catfish (order Siluriformes). N. ferrarisi is classified in the tribe Hypoptopomatini within the subfamily Hypoptopomatinae. This fish reaches a length of  SL.  This species is endemic to Venezuela and occurs in the upper Baria River and the Rio Negro basin.

The fish is named in honor of Carl Ferraris, Jr. (b. 1950), co-discoverer of this species and participant in the 1984 South American expedition to the type locality of the fish.

References

Hypoptopomatini
Taxa named by Francisco Provenzano-Rizzi
Fish described in 1998
Endemic fauna of Venezuela
Fish of Venezuela